Edward Craig Morris (October 7, 1939 – June 14, 2006) was an American archaeologist who was best known for his Inca expeditions and creating a modern understanding of the Inca civilization. 

Morris was dean of science and chair of Department of Anthropology at the American Museum of Natural History,
a member of the National Academy of Sciences,
a member of the American Academy of Arts and Sciences.
The New York Times called Morris "a towering figure in Inca expeditions" and said that he "helped transform modern knowledge of the Inca civilization".
The National Academy of Sciences said that his studies became classics of the field.

Chronology
 1939: born on October 7 in Murray, Kentucky
 1961: bachelor's degree in psychology and philosophy, magna cum laude, Vanderbilt University
 1967: Ph.D., the University of Chicago
 1967–1968: Assistant Professor, Northern Illinois University
 1968–1975: Assistant Professor, Brandeis University
 1975–1980: Assistant Curator of Anthropology, American Museum of Natural History, New York
 1976: Visiting Associate Professor of Anthropology, Cornell University
 1977: Visiting Professor of Archaeology, Universidad Nacional Mayor de San Marcos, Lima, Peru
 1977–1992: Adjunct Professor, Cornell University
 1983–1990: Chair, Department of Anthropology, American Museum of Natural History
 1986: Visiting Professor of Anthropology, City University of New York Graduate Center
 1989–1991: Guest Curator, "Art in the Age of Exploration (Inka Section)," National Gallery of Art
 1992–1997: Adjunct Professor of Anthropology, Columbia University
 1994–2005: Dean of Science, American Museum of Natural History
 1998–2005: Vice-President, American Museum of Natural History
 1980–2006: Curator of Anthropology, American Museum of Natural History
 2006: Died June 14 in New York City

References

External links
 

1939 births
2006 deaths
University of Chicago alumni
Vanderbilt University alumni
Members of the United States National Academy of Sciences
People from Murray, Kentucky
Northern Illinois University faculty
Brandeis University faculty
Cornell University faculty
Columbia University faculty
20th-century American archaeologists